Brothers. The final confession is a 2013 Ukrainian drama film directed by Viktoria Trofimenko. The film based on Torgny Lindgren's novel Sweetness, which was published in 1995.

The film was presented at more than twenty film festivals, including three "A" class film forums in Goa, Shanghai and Moscow. On the last one it received the Film Crytics Prize and Best Actress Award for Natalka Polovynka.

The world premiere took place on 28 November 2013 in the main competition at the International Film Festival of India in Goa. In Ukraine, the film was presented at the international film festival "Molodist" on 18 September 2014, and come out in wide release on 24 September 2015.

Plot 
The film is a psychological drama developing on the highlands of the Carpathian Mountains. Two helpless old men, brothers, desperately trying to keep up competition with each other in order to prolong their lives. Even though their bodies are decaying and both are sick, the one still wants to outlive the other. But one day a woman enters their remote dwelling.

Cast 
 Mykola Bereza as Young Voytko
 Viktor Demertash as Old Stanislav
 Yuri Denysenkov as Saint Christopher
 Roman Lutskiy as Young Stanislav
 Oleg Mosijchuk as Old Voytko
 Natalka Polovynka as Writer
 Veronika Shostak as Yvha
 Orest Yagish as Demiyon

References

External links 
 Synopsis: Braty. Ostannya spovid
 

2013 drama films
2013 films
Ukrainian-language films
Ukrainian drama films